General Sir Robert George Victor FitzGeorge-Balfour,  (15 September 1913 – 28 December 1994) was a senior officer in the British Army.

Early life
Robert George Victor FitzGeorge-Balfour was born on 15 September 1913 at Knightsbridge, London. He was the son of Robert Shekelton Balfour and Mabel Iris FitzGeorge. Through his mother he was descended from George III of the United Kingdom through the king's grandson Prince George, Duke of Cambridge and his mistress Sarah Fairbrother. In 1922 his name was legally changed to Victor FitzGeorge-Balfour by deed poll. FitzGeorge-Balfour was educated at Eton College and at King's College, Cambridge.

Military career
FitzGeorge-Balfour was commissioned a second lieutenant in the Coldstream Guards' Supplementary Reserve of Officers on 25 June 1932. He transferred to the regular Coldstream Guards on 1 February 1934, and was promoted to lieutenant on 25 June 1935. He served in Palestine during the Arab revolt, for which he was awarded the Military Cross in 1939.

FitzGeorge-Balfour fought in the Second World War, serving in North Africa, Sicily and North-West Europe as a staff officer with XXX Corps. By March 1941, he was a temporary captain. He was made a substantive captain on 1 February 1942, and was a temporary major by October 1943. That same month, he was appointed Member of the Order of the British Empire "in recognition of gallant and distinguished
services in the Middle East". He served on the general staff of VIII Corps in 1944 and, by 1945, he was a temporary brigadier. He ended the war as a war substantive lieutenant colonel, and was advanced to Commander of the Order of the British Empire on 11 October 1945 "in recognition of gallant and distinguished services in North-West Europe". He had been Mentioned in Despatches twice during the war: on 1 April 1941, "for distinguished services in the Middle East during the period August 1939 to November 1940", and on 23 March 1944 "in recognition of gallant and distinguished services in Sicily".

Having reverted to the rank of captain following the end of the war, FitzGeorge-Balfour was promoted to major on 1 February 1947. In 1948, he was appointed Commanding Officer of the 2nd Battalion, Coldstream Guards in Malaya. For his command of the battalion during the Malayan Emergency, he was Mentioned in Despatches on 13 December 1949 and awarded the Distinguished Service Order on 18 September 1950.

FitzGeorge-Balfour was promoted to colonel on 15 September 1954 with seniority from 17 June. The following year, he attended the Imperial Defence College. He was made commander of the First Brigade of Guards in 1958, Deputy Director of Staff Duties in 1960, and Chief of Staff at Southern Command in 1962. He went on to be Director of Military Operations in 1964, Senior Army Instructor at the Imperial Defence College in 1967 and Vice Chief of the General Staff in 1968. He was appointed a Knight Commander of the Order of the Bath that same year. His last appointment was as UK Military Representative to NATO before he retired in 1974.

Later life
FitzGeorge-Balfour was Chairman of the National Fund for Research into Crippling Diseases from 1975 to 1989. He was appointed Colonel Commandant of The Honourable Artillery Company, a Territorial Army unit, on 2 August 1976. His tenure expired on 1 September 1984, when he was succeeded by General Sir Richard Trant. He held the office of Deputy Lieutenant (DL) of West Sussex in 1977.

FitzGeorge-Balfour died on 28 December 1994 at West Chiltington, West Sussex. He was buried on 4 January 1995 at Findon Crematorium, Worthing, West Sussex.

Personal life
FitzGeorge-Balfour married Mary Diana Christian, daughter of Arthur Christian and Geraldine Diana Monsell, at the Chapel Royal of St. James's Palace on 4 December 1943. Together they had two children: Diana Mary Christian FitzGeorge-Balfour (born 8 March 1946); and Robert Victor FitzGeorge-Balfour (born 5 June 1951).

Ancestry

References

External links
thePeerage.com – General Sir Robert George Victor FitzGeorge-Balfour
Generals of World War II

|-

|-

 

1913 births
1994 deaths
Burials in Sussex
Alumni of King's College, Cambridge
British Army generals
British Army personnel of the Malayan Emergency
British military personnel of the 1936–1939 Arab revolt in Palestine
British military personnel of the Cyprus Emergency
British Army brigadiers of World War II
Coldstream Guards officers
Commanders of the Order of the British Empire
Companions of the Distinguished Service Order
Deputy Lieutenants of West Sussex
Victor FitzGeorge-Balfour
Knights Commander of the Order of the Bath
People educated at Eton College
People from Knightsbridge
Recipients of the Military Cross
People from West Chiltington
Graduates of the Royal College of Defence Studies
Military personnel from London